The Entrada Sandstone is a formation in the San Rafael Group  found in  the U.S. states of Wyoming, Colorado, northwest New Mexico, northeast Arizona, and southeast Utah. Part of the Colorado Plateau, this formation was deposited during the Jurassic Period sometime between 180 and 140 million years ago in various environments, including tidal mudflats, beaches, and sand dunes. The Middle Jurassic San Rafael Group was dominantly deposited as ergs (sand seas) in a desert environment around the shallow Sundance Sea.

Description
At its type section at Entrada Point, located in the northern part the San Rafael Swell in Emery County, Utah, the Entrada consists of red silty sandstone and lesser interbedded mudstone and is a slope-forming formation. This part of the Entrada is sometimes described as the "earthy facies". Here the Entrada is overlain by the Curtis Formation, and overlies the Carmel Formation.To the south and east, the Entrada transitions to cliff-forming red or white crossbedded sandstone, sometimes called the "slickrock facies".

The white color is attributed to bleaching by organic-rich fluids from overlying beds. The formation rests on the Carmel Formation and is overlain by the Morrison Formation. 

In the Curtis Mountains region of northeastern Arizona, the Entrada is overlain by the Wanakah Formation.

In the San Juan Basin of northwestern New Mexico, the Entrada consists of upper and lower sandy members and a medial silty member, the Rehoboth Member. The Curtis Formation is sometimes absent and the Entrada then overlies Chinle Formation. It is overlain by the Todilto Formation. Southeast of Fort Defiance, Arizona, the lower sandy beds are assigned to the Iyanbito Member.

In the Slick Rock, Colorado area, the Entrada is divided into a "middle sandstone", the Rehoboth Member, and the Slick Rock Member, in ascending order.

The Entrada has been dated to the early to middle Callovian stage of the latest Middle Jurassic.

History of investigation
The Entrada Sandstone was named as one of the four formations of the San Rafael Group by James Gilluly and Reeside in 1928. Gregory and Moore worked out the geographic extent of the formation and gave an overview of it in 1931. The extent was revised several times afterwards (most recently in 1992 by Condon). It was divided into the Gunsight Butte, Cannonville, and Escalante members by Thompson and Stokes in 1970. The principal reference for the formation was written in 1988 by Peterson.

Members
Entrada members are (in alphabetical order):
Cannonville Member (UT)
Cow Springs Member (AZ); equivalent to the upper member at the reference section in southern Utah
Dewey Bridge Member (CO, UT) - named after the type locality at Dewey Bridge. This brick-red layer has a blocky look to it. Now assigned to the Carmel Formation.
Escalante Member (UT)
Henrieville Member (UT); abandoned by Peterson in 1988.
Exeter Member (NM)
Gunsight Butte Member (UT)
Iyanbito Member (NM)
Moab Member (CO, UT) or Moab Tongue (CO, UT) - named after the type locality of Moab, Utah. The whitish sands from inland dunes make up this "cap rock" layer, as seen atop Delicate Arch and Broken Arch in Arches National Park.
Red Mesa Member (AZ, NM, UT)
Slick Rock Member (CO, UT) - named for the type locality at Slick Rock, Colorado; rounded beach sands were cemented together to create this uniform layer.

Places found

Entrada Sandstone is found in these geologic locations:

Geologic province:
Anadarko Basin
Black Mesa Basin
Great Basin province
Green River Basin
Las Vegas-Raton Basin
Paradox Basin
Piceance Basin
Plateau Sedimentary Province
San Juan Basin
Sierra Grande Uplift

Found in these parklands (incomplete list):
Arches National Park
Capitol Reef National Park
Goblin Valley State Park
Kodachrome Basin State Park

Spatial distribution:
spatial distribution of Entrada Sandstone in Macrostrat

References

Further reading
USGS GEOLEX database entry for Entrada Sandstone Accessed 18 March 2006 (public domain text)

External links

 Entrada Sandstone in Goblin Valley State Park
 The Middle Jurassic Entrada Sandstone in Northeastern Arizona and Adjacent Areas, 2003, New Mexico Geological Society Guidebook, Geology of the Zuni Plateau

Sandstone formations of the United States
Jurassic geology of Utah
Geologic formations of Wyoming
Geologic formations of Colorado
Jurassic formations of New Mexico
Geologic formations of Arizona
Oxfordian Stage